Vladimir Gordeev (born 30 November 1950 in Georgia, Soviet Union) is a former Soviet international speedway rider who reached the finals of the Speedway World Championship three times but was disqualified in 1971 for using illegal fuel additives. His younger brother Valery Gordeev is also a former rider who reached the World Final on five occasions.

World Final appearances

Individual World Championship
 1970 -  Wroclaw, Olympic Stadium - 13th - 5pts
 1971 -  Göteborg, Ullevi - dsq - 11pts (later disqualified for illegal fuel additives)
 1974 -  Göteborg, Ullevi - 16th - 0pts
 1975 -  London, Wembley Stadium - Reserve - 0pts
 1976 -  Chorzów, Silesian Stadium - 16th - 0pts

World Pairs Championship
 1973 -  Borås  (with Anatoly Kuzmin) - 4th - 20pts (10)
 1974 -  Manchester, Hyde Road (with Grigory Khlinovsky) - 6th - 10pts (4)

World Team Cup
 1971 -  Wroclaw, Olympic Stadium (with Grigory Khlinovsky /  Vladimir Smirnov / Anatoly Kuzmin) - 2nd - 22pts (4)
 1974 -  Chorzów, Silesian Stadium (with Vladimir Kalmykov / Mikhail Krasnov / Anatoly Kuzmin) - 4th - 10pts (4)
 1975 –  Norden, Motodrom Halbemond (with Valery Gordeev / Grigory Khlinovsky / Viktor Trofimov) – 2nd – 29pts (5)
 1976 -  London, White City Stadium (with Viktor Trofimov / Valery Gordeev / Grigory Khlinovsky / Vladimir Paznikov) - 4th - 11pts (2)

References

1950 births
Living people
Russian speedway riders
Soviet speedway riders